Indigenous peoples of South America have been involved in several wars of different scale and nature. Conflicts with Iberoamerican states and between different indigenous groups have decreased over time.

 Battle of the Maule
 Inca Civil War (1525–1527)
 Spanish conquest of the Inca Empire (1532–1572)
 Arauco War (1536- ~1800)
 Guaraní War (1756)
 Rebellion of Túpac Amaru II (1780–1782)
 Chilean War of Independence (1810–1822)
 Occupation of Araucanía (1861–1884)
 Conquest of the Desert (1872–1884)

Military history of Latin America
Indigenous topics of South America
Military history of South America
Wars involving the states and peoples of South America